Lenny Zakatek (born Lenny du Platel, 1947) is a British singer and musician who has lived in London since the age of thirteen. Zakatek was born just prior to Karachi becoming part of Pakistan and is best known for his work with the British bands Gonzalez and The Alan Parsons Project.

Early years
In 1964, Zakatek formed a rock band called The Trailblazers, as lead singer and rhythm guitarist. On their first tour of US military bases in Europe, they became familiar with the Motown sound. The Trailblazers returned to the UK with a new soul influence and were renamed Funky Fever. They toured the UK and Europe for several years and also played nightclubs in London, including Gulliver's, Whisky a Go Go, The Marquee, Ronnie Scott's, The Scotch of St. James and The Revolution. Funky Fever also backed Inez and Charlie Foxx and The Drifters on their European tours.

Lynsey de Paul and Dudley Moore took an interest in Zakatek's voice, look and stage presence in the early 1970s. De Paul dubbed him "Zakatek" and wrote two singles "I Gotcha Now" backed with "So Good To You" (later recorded by de Paul as the B-side on her hit single "Won't Somebody Dance With Me") and singles "Get Your Gun" backed with "Gotta Runaway". A German version of "Get Your Gun" entitled "Roter Mann", with German lyrics by Gunther Gabriel, was recorded by Zakatek and released in 1974 and appeared on a compilation CD released in 2000 De Paul introduced him to the UK through an article in the Daily Mirror entitled "Sugar Girl's Heap Big Find". The musicians who were featured on Zakatek's solo work were already known as some of the members of 10cc.

Success
Between 1974 and 1981, Zakatek was the lead singer with Gonzalez. They recorded successful albums, including Our Only Weapon Is Our Music, and Shipwrecked. The worldwide disco hit, "Haven't Stopped Dancing Yet" came from this collaboration. In 1977, Zakatek became a studio vocalist for The Alan Parsons Project, singing on their albums over a ten-year period. He was featured on twenty-four songs on eight Alan Parsons Project albums, including the hits "I Wouldn't Want to Be Like You", "Games People Play", "You Don't Believe" and "Damned If I Do". The allaboutjazz.com reviewer Todd S. Jenkins wrote that: "Lenny Zakatek's singing on ["I Wouldn't Want To Be Like You" and "Games People Play"] is prototypical of soulful prog-rock ... detached from the electronic melange."

Solo work
1979 saw the release of Zakatek's first solo album Lenny Zakatek, which was produced by Alan Parsons for A&M Records. Single releases included "Brandy", "Say I Love You" and "Where Is The Love". In 1986, Zakatek formed a band called The Immortals, with John Deacon on bass guitar, and Robert Ahwai on lead guitar. Their single "No Turning Back" was included on the soundtrack to the film Biggles.

In 1986, he guested on the track "Angel", written by Bob Weston, included on the Dick Morrissey album Souliloquy, and which also featured both Ahwai and Weston.

In 1988, he began a parallel career as a manager, music publisher and record producer. He managed and co-produced three of Japan's most prolific recording artists, Tomoyasu Hotei, Miki Imai and Kumiko Yamashita. he also co-wrote and produced several songs on Hotei's first solo album, Guitarhythm. In the UK he managed 7th Heaven, Huff and Herb, and The 3 Jays. The latter two acts achieved successes in the dance market. Zakatek's publishing company All Zakatek Music, co-published some of the cuts on Kubb's debut album. He has published and managed Sony/BMG artist Jah Waggie, the creative alter-ego of Jeff Patterson. Zakatek's second solo album Small But Hard, was released in 1989.

In 1995, Zakatek performed with Joni Mitchell at the Great Music Experience in Nara City, Japan. He shared the stage with INXS, Bon Jovi, Bob Dylan and Tomoyasu Hotei and worked with Michael Kamen, with whom he went to do other projects.

2000 onwards
Zakatek now plays throughout Europe and the UK with the Boogie Brothers, a 12 piece R&B band. He has also appeared at corporate events as a solo performer, along with his son and daughter Amber du Platel and singer-songwriter Leon du Platel.

In March 2010, Zakatek announced a return to the stage playing a selection of Alan Parsons Project songs. He also performed on Frankie Miller's album of duets Frankie Miller's Double Take (2016), appearing with Miller on the track "I Never Want to Lose You". The songs on this album were recorded as demos by Miller prior to his brain haemorrhage in New York in 1994.

References

External links

Biography at The Avenue Online

1947 births
Living people
A&M Records artists
EMI Records artists
English rhythm and blues singers
English male singers
English pop singers
Indian emigrants to the United Kingdom
Singers from Karachi
The Alan Parsons Project members
Gonzalez (band) members